The 122nd Fighter Aviation Squadron (Serbo-Croatian:  / 122. ловачка авијацијска ескадрила) was an aviation squadron of Yugoslav Air Force established in April 1961 as part of 94th Fighter Aviation Regiment at Skopski Petrovac military airport.

It was equipped with US-made North American F-86E Sabre jet fighter aircraft.

By the end of 1964 the 83rd Fighter Aviation Regiment has been disbanded per the "Drvar 2" reorganization plan. The 122nd Fighter Aviation Squadron was also disbanded. Its personnel and equipment were attached to 123rd Fighter Aviation Squadron.

Assignments
94th Fighter Aviation Regiment (1961-1964)

Bases stationed
Skopski Petrovac (1961–1964)

Equipment
North American F-86E Sabre (1961–1964)

References

Yugoslav Air Force squadrons
Military units and formations established in 1961
Military units and formations disestablished in 1964